The Thomas Dale House is an early 18th century house in Charleston, South Carolina. The house appears to have been built between 1716 and 1733; Miles Brewton referred to the existing house in a deed of December 1733 when he conveyed the house to his daughter, Mrs. Mary Brewton Dale. Mr. Brewton's son-in-law, Thomas Dale, was a doctor who also translated books, wrote literary pieces, and even served as an assistant justice despite being a "person[] entirely ignorant of the law."

The house originally was three stories, but the top level was removed during a later remodeling. A half-story was returned to the house later still.

References

Houses in Charleston, South Carolina